The Château de Courtrai is a former fortified castle built starting from 1299 in the northeast of Lille, France on orders of Philip IV of France after the 1297 siege and gradually demolished starting from 1577.

Origins 
During the Flanders War which opposed the County of Flanders to the Kingdom of France at the end of the 13th century, Philip the Fair, the King of France eager to assert his authority over this territory which was in part vassal, but in practice enjoyed independence, took possession of the major cities of Flanders, including Lille in 1297 and had three fortified castles built in them: Bruges, Courtrai and Lille to control them. The works in Lille were started in 1299.

Construction

Location and consequences on the urban walls 

The castle is located northeast of the bank of the Basse-Deûle at the location of the Courtrai suburb on the road to Bruges (current Rue de Gand) in front of the gate of the same name approximately between the current Tours Street, the Célestines Street and the Avenue du Peuple Belge, causing the destruction of the old suburb.. The construction led to the creation of a road bypassing the castle to the east (current Saint-Jacques Street, Place aux Bleuets and Rue de Courtrai) and the creation of a new Courtrai gate on this axis.

Structure 

The castle encloses the road to Bruges, which runs diagonally within the fortress between its two gates: the "front gate" facing the city and the "back gate" facing the countryside. The gate towards the city was located near the Collégiale Saint-Pierre, and the gate towards the countryside had a bridge over the Basse Deûle river. The castle's shape is that of an irregular quadrilateral measuring 150 meters by 190 meters, with an interior surface area of 2.95 hectares.

The width of its curtain walls ranged from 2.30 to 5 meters, and the walls were flanked by several towers with diameters of about 14 meters. The fortress was surrounded by a moat fed by the Basse Deûle. The two gates of the fortress were framed by towers and protected by drawbridges. The bridge of the front gate extended to a bridge over the Basse Deûle river, giving access to the old Porte de Courtrai, which had become the chanoines' gate, near the Collégiale Saint-Pierre in the city wall.

In the early days, access to the city was controlled by the two gates of the fortress, which attackers from Flanders would have had to cross to enter Lille. The fortress, occupying one of the main penetration routes, thus constituted a powerful advanced protection for the city. The gate of Courtrai, which appears on the Deventer plan of the 1560s, at the corner of Rue Saint-Jacques and Rue des Tours, giving access to a road that bypassed the castle, along the current Rue Saint-Jacques and Rue de Courtrai, would have been built later. The front gate has not been excavated, so its precise location is unknown.

The castle housed the governor's residence, military housing, prisons, stores of food reserves, armaments and munitions, and archives (Trésor des chartes) were deposited in one of its towers. A chapel (formerly Saint-Vital Chapel) is still standing on the site.

The castle's strategic location made it an important target during the Siege of Lille (1792), and it was used as a French military hospital during World War I.

After its demolition in 1577, the governor's residence was relocated to the Hôtel de Santes on Rue de Tournai.

After the castle was dismantled, the governor's residence was transferred to the Hôtel de Santes on Rue de l'Abbiette, now known as Rue de Tournai.

In 1617, the area of the former castle was included in a new fortification between Porte de Gand and Porte de Roubaix, which expanded the city. The chapel of the castle was preserved and is now known as the former Saint-Vital Chapel.

The canal du Pont de Flandre, which began at the Abreuvoir Saint-Jacques and flowed between Rue des Tours and Rue de Courtrai, passing under Rue de Gand to the Basse Deûle near Rue Saint-Joseph, followed the old moat of the castle. The canal was completely covered over around 1900.

Today, there are no visible remains of the castle, except for the Rue du Château which passes through the former site of the castle. The location of the castle is marked by a plaque on the facade of the building at 51 rue des Tours.

References

Voir aussi 

Castles in France
Lille
Ruined castles
Former castles
Former castles in France